In Greek mythology, Alcmaon (Ancient Greek: Ἀλκμάονα) was the son of Thestor. He was one of the Achaean warriors who fought at Troy but was killed by the Lycian leader Sarpedon with a spear.

Note

References 

 Homer, The Iliad with an English Translation by A.T. Murray, Ph.D. in two volumes. Cambridge, MA., Harvard University Press; London, William Heinemann, Ltd. 1924. . Online version at the Perseus Digital Library.
 Homer, Homeri Opera in five volumes. Oxford, Oxford University Press. 1920. . Greek text available at the Perseus Digital Library.

Achaeans (Homer)